Trusten Polk Dyer (May 27, 1856 – December 18, 1926) was an American politician in the state of Washington. He served in the Washington State Senate from 1891 to 1895. From 1893 to 1895, he was President pro tempore of the Senate.

References

Republican Party Washington (state) state senators
1856 births
1926 deaths